The exsymmedians are three lines associated with a triangle. More precisely for a given triangle the exsymmedians are the tangent lines on the triangle's circumcircle through the three vertices of the triangle. The triangle formed by the three exsymmedians is the tangential triangle and its vertices, that is the three intersections of the exsymmedians are called exsymmedian points.

For a triangle  with   being the exsymmedians and  being  the symmedians through the vertices  two exsymmedians and one symmedian intersect in a common point, that is:

The length of the perpendicular line segment connecting a triangle side with its associated exsymmedian point is proportional to that triangle side. Specifically the following formulas apply:

Here  denotes the area of the triangle  and  the perpendicular line segments connecting the triangle sides  with the exsymmedian points .

References 
 Roger A. Johnson: Advanced Euclidean Geometry. Dover 2007, pp. 214–215 (originally published 1929 with Houghton Mifflin Company (Boston) as Modern Geometry).

Straight lines defined for a triangle